Alina Vladimirovna Ustimkina (born 2 September 2000) is a Russian pair skater. With her former partner, Nikita Volodin, she is the 2016 CS Tallinn Trophy champion and 2016 Youth Olympic bronze medalist.

Personal life 
Alina Vladimirovna Ustimkina was born on 2 September 2000 in Nizhny Novgorod, Russia. On 9 July 2020 she married a Russian pair skater Nodari Maisuradze.

Career

Early years 
Ustimkina began skating in 2006. She trained in Nizhny Novgorod until 2011 and then moved to Saint Petersburg, where she competed in singles until November 2013. Her first pairs partner was Maxim Bobrov. In April 2014, they placed fifth at the Russia Junior Championships – Elder Age.

Partnership with Volodin 
Ustimkina and Nikita Volodin debuted their partnership in September 2014. They competed at events within Russia during their first season together and began appearing internationally in the 2015–16 season. In August 2015, they were sent to Riga, Latvia to compete at their first ISU Junior Grand Prix (JGP) assignment, placing fifth. In November, they won the junior gold medal at the NRW Trophy, outscoring silver medalists Anna Dušková / Martin Bidař by 19.22 points.

In January 2016, Ustimkina/Volodin placed fifth at the Russian Junior Championships. In February, they represented Russia at the 2016 Winter Youth Olympics in Hamar, Norway. Ranked third in both segments, they were awarded the bronze medal behind Ekaterina Borisova / Dmitry Sopot and Dušková/Bidař. Assigned to Team Determination for the mixed NOC team event, Ustimkina/Volodin placed third in their segment and their team finished 8th.

Ustimkina and Volodin ended their partnership in late 2017.

Later career 

In August 2018, Ustimkina began skating with Alexei Rogonov.

Programs 

(with Volodin)

Competitive highlights 
CS: Challenger Series; JGP: Junior Grand Prix

With Volodin

With Bobrov

Single skating

Detailed results 
With Volodin

References

External links 

 
 

2000 births
Russian female pair skaters
Living people
Sportspeople from Nizhny Novgorod
Figure skaters at the 2016 Winter Youth Olympics